Aussurucq is a commune in the Pyrénées-Atlantiques department in the Nouvelle-Aquitaine region of south-western France.

The inhabitants are known as Altzürükütar.

Geography
Aussurucq is located in the former province of Soule in the Massif des Arbailles some 30 km west by south-west of Oloron-Sainte-Marie and 25 km east of Saint-Jean-Pied-de-Port. Access to the commune is by road D147 from Idaux-Mendy in the north which passes through the village and continues south through the commune to join the D117 on the southern border of the commune. A pastoral road from Béhorléguy to Alçay and Aussurucq passes through the Col d'Aphanize (without crossing it) and generally follows the line of the watershed along the Col de Burdin Olatzé. The commune is mostly rugged and heavily forested however there is some farmland in the north.

The Ruisseau de Guessalia rises in the south of the commune and flows north-east gathering some tributaries to join the Apouhoura north of the commune. The Arangorena forms the north-western border as it flows north-east to join the Saison near Gotein-Libarrenx. The Bidouze rises in the south of the commune and flows north to eventually join the Adour north of Bardos.

Places and Hamlets

 Abeheaborda
 Ahancetaborda
 Ahanzolha
 Ahusquy: known for its spring of the same name
 Althabéa (ruins)
 Althabegoïty
 Ambukoborda
 Ardiaénéa
 Ascune (rocks)
 Athekaketa
 Bagadoy
 Barnexborda
 Baskinabe
 Behegayborda
 Beherégaray (barns)
 Burdin-Clatze (col)
 Capara (barn)
 Carriquiborda
 Chalunia
 Cumba
 Elsareko Ordokia
 Erbinia (cayolar)
 Etchakokoua
 Etchaltia (rocks)
 Etchebidea
 Etchecopar
 Etchekolaz
 Exaltia (cayolar)
 Gettaborda
 Goyheneix
 Guessalia
 Harribiribile
 Hasgagnia
 Haspia (rocks)
 Héguilloré (cayolar)
 Hidogaratia (col)
 Hidondo
 Ibarrondoa
 Ihatia
 Inharpu (col)
 Istaurdy (cayolar)
 Jaguiborda
 Jaragoyhen
 Karkatz
 Lagay
 Lapistoy
 Lapitz (field)
 Larraguy
 Larramendy
 Latchéra
 Lecharegaratia (cayolar)
 Lecharéguibela (cayolar)
 Leycharzepia (fountain)
 Lhastéria
 Lohiolha
 Lucugnébehety (cayolar)
 Miadore (cayolar)
 Mouchako
 Naboleguy (cayolar)
 Nébélé (fountain)
 Nékolha
 Olhatzezarre (cayolar)
 Otxolatzé (fontaine)
 Potcho (cayolars)
 Sallaberria
 Sorzauqui (col)
 Souhourtia (cayolar)
 Thartassu
 Udoya (cayolar)
 Uhalberryborda
 Uhaldéa
 Uhaltéberria
 Uhartéa
 Urrutchoya
 Urrutia (château)
 Uthurbietta (fountain)
 Uthurieta (cayolar)
 Zouhourtia

Toponymy
The commune name in basque is Altzürükü.

Jean-Baptiste Orpustan indicated that the name comes from the basque altzu ("alder tree") which is explained by the position of the valley covered in alder trees. The second part of the name is more enigmatic. According to Orpustan it could be from Urru ("the other side") or iri giving alzu-(i) ri-ku meaning "place in the Alder field".

The following table details the origins of the commune name and other names in the commune.

Sources:

Orpustan: Jean-Baptiste Orpustan, New Basque Toponymy
Raymond: Topographic Dictionary of the Department of Basses-Pyrenees, 1863, on the page numbers indicated in the table. 

Origins:

Duchesne: Duchesne collection volume CXIV
Notaries: Notaries of Navarrenx
Chapter: Titles of the Chapter of Bayonne
Soule: Customs of Soule

History
In the Middle Palaeolithic era Soule was already populated as remains of Neanderthal prehistoric man have been found in the Xaxixiloaga caves in Aussurucq. A tumulus was also reported at shepherd's cabins in Potxo along the D147 road.

The central part of Soule is also called the Messagerie des Arbailles between Basabürü and Pettarra (in the Sauguis-Saint-Étienne, Aussurucq, and Barcus regions).

Administration

List of Successive Mayors

Inter-communality
The commune is part of six inter-communal structures:
 the Communauté d'agglomération du Pays Basque;
 the sanitation association for Pays du Soule;
 the Energy association of Pyrénées-Atlantiques;
 the inter-communal association of Arbailla;
 the inter-communal association for transport from Musculdy to Ordiap;
 the inter-communal association to support Basque culture.

Demography
In 2017 the commune had 245 inhabitants.

Economy
Economic activity is based on agriculture (livestock and pasture). The commune is part of the Appellation d'origine contrôlée (AOC) zone of Ossau-iraty.

Culture and Heritage

The village features a dynamic scene related especially to Basque culture. The inhabitants of the village performed the pastoral Ürrüti Jauregiko Peirot in 2002, a play written by the son of the village Niko Etxart, an acclaimed Basque musician.

Civil heritage
The Chateau of Ruthie (11th century) is registered as an historical monument.
A Gaztelu Zahar (Castellum) is at a place called gaztelu at an altitude of 582 metres.

Religious heritage

The town has a church with a Trinitarian steeple or a tower surmounted by three points of nearly equal height. The church contains a processional cross (17th century) which is registered as an historical object.

Environmental heritage
At the end of the 19th century, the Arbailles Forest covered parts of the communes of Aussurucq, Béhorléguy, Camou-Cihigue, Musculdy, Ordiarp, and Saint-Just-Ibarre.

A wealth of heritage in Aussurucq commune is contained in its sub-soil. Most of the territory of the commune is karstic. The environment is characterized by the presence of natural cavities in complex shapes that have not all yet been discovered or much less explored to date. Departmental cavers have undertaken the exploration, description, and publication of this heritage respecting the environment and the local population. One of the most beautiful caves in the commune is the Nébélé which has been the subject of works and regular explorations since 1972.

The peak of Ascune stands at 860 m, Echagorry is 935 m, Elsarré is 1,153 m, Sihigue is 1,193 m, and Etchecortia is 1,204 m. In the south-west of the commune, Bohorcortia is 1,214 metres high.

Amenities
The town has a primary school (Garaibie).

Notable people linked to the commune
Pierre V de Charritte de Ruthie, born in Aussurucq, was chaplain to François I.
Gilen Epherre, born at Aussurucq in 1911 and died in Bayonne in 1974, was a writer, priest, scholar and important cultural player in the post-war period

See also
Communes of the Pyrénées-Atlantiques department

References

External links
ALTZÜRUKÜ in the Bernardo Estornés Lasa - Auñamendi Encyclopedia (Euskomedia Fundazioa) 
Aussurucq on the Community of communes Soule-Xiberoa official website 
Aussurucq on Géoportail, National Geographic Institute (IGN) website 
Anßuruc on the 1750 Cassini Map

Communes of Pyrénées-Atlantiques